The Walking Dead: Daryl Dixon is an upcoming American post-apocalyptic television series created by Angela Kang and Scott M. Gimple, based on The Walking Dead character of the same name. It is intended to be the fifth spin-off and overall sixth television series in The Walking Dead franchise, sharing continuity with the other series, and set after the conclusion of the original The Walking Dead television series. David Zabel serves as showrunner of the series.

Norman Reedus reprises his role as Daryl Dixon from the original television series, alongside Clémence Poésy and Adam Nagaitis playing new characters. Development of the series begun September 2020. The series was originally set to feature the character of Carol Peletier, but she was written off the show due to logistical issues involving the actress Melissa McBride, so the focus of the series shifted to Daryl. The title of the series was revealed in October 2022, with additional casting taking place starting in November. Filming began in Paris, France in October 2022.

The Walking Dead: Daryl Dixon is scheduled to premiere in 2023, and will consist of six episodes.

Premise
Daryl washes ashore in France and struggles to piece together how he got there and why. The series tracks his journey across a broken but resilient France as he hopes to find a way back home. As he makes the journey, though, the connections he forms along the way complicate his ultimate plan.

Cast and characters
 Norman Reedus as Daryl Dixon: A skilled hunter and former recruiter of Alexandria who survived the outbreak with Rick Grimes' group and later became a short-lived soldier of the Commonwealth Army. At some point following The Walking Deads final episode, Daryl wakes up to find himself in France and tries to piece together what happened.
 Clémence Poésy as Isabelle: A member of a progressive religious group who joins Daryl in France where Isabelle has a dark past in Paris.
 Adam Nagaitis as Quinn: The owner of an underground nightclub in Paris called the Demimonde who has become a powerful figure after the zombie apocalypse.
 Anne Charrier as Genet
 Eriq Ebanouey as Fallou
 Laika Blanc Francard as Sylvie
 Romain Levi as Codron 
 Louis Puech Scigliuzzi as Laurent

Production

Development 
The series was announced in September 2020 by Angela Kang and Scott M. Gimple. Reedus and McBride signed on to reprise their respective roles from the television series.

In April 2022, McBride exited the series due to logistical reasons as the show was set to film in mid-2022 in Europe and it wasn't possible for McBride to be with the show with this setup. The series was reworked as a sole Daryl project. Days later, Kang had left the role of showrunner and was replaced by David Zabel. The deal had reportedly been sealed in recent weeks before McBride's exit from the show. In October, the series was given the title Daryl Dixon. In January 2023, it was announced that the series would be titled The Walking Dead: Daryl Dixon and premiere later in 2023.

Writing 
In September 2020, Kang was hired as showrunner after she had helmed the final three seasons of The Walking Dead.

In April 2022, Kang had stepped down due to other commitments and Zabel had taken the role, scripts were already being written by this time, but needed to be reworked following McBride's departure. In September, in an interview with Entertainment Weekly, Reedus explained that the series would be going an opposite direction from the main series having it being a completely different story from what we have already seen with Daryl. The following month, Reedus said that there would be familiar faces from the main series in the spin-off.

Casting 
In November 2022, Clémence Poésy and Adam Nagaitis were added to the main cast. In February 2023, Anne Charrier, Eriq Ebanouey, Laika Blanc Francard, Romain Levi and Louis Puech Scigliuzzi were announced as additional cast members.

Filming 
Principal photography began on October 24, 2022, in Paris, France.

Release 
The series is scheduled to premiere in 2023.

References

External links
 

 
The Walking Dead (franchise) television series

2020s American drama television series
2020s American horror television series
AMC (TV channel) original programming
American horror fiction television series
English-language television shows
Horror drama television series
Post-apocalyptic television series
Serial drama television series
Television shows based on comics
Television series about viral outbreaks
Television series based on Image Comics
Television shows filmed in Paris
Television shows set in Paris
Zombies in television
Upcoming drama television series